Aschenberg is a small village in the district of Celle, Lower Saxony, Germany. It is part of the Ortschaft Höfer within the municipality of Eschede.

Villages in Lower Saxony
Celle (district)